WSUN was the call sign used from 1927 until 1999 by a St. Petersburg, Florida radio station that broadcasts to Tampa Bay Area, Florida. After 1999 the station continued to operate under different call letters.

History

WSUN jointly licensed with WFLA as WFLA-WSUN

WSUN was first authorized in October 1927, joining an existing station, WFLA, at 590 kHz, with this station now assigned a dual call sign of WFLA-WSUN, under shared ownership by the Clearwater and St. Petersburg Chambers of Commerce. WSUN made its debut broadcast on November 1st, using the slogan "Why Stay Up North".

In 1927 WFLA-WSUN moved to 580 kHz, then to 900 kHz the next year. In 1929, radio frequencies for stations in Florida were reallocated, and WFLA-WSUN moved to 620 kHz.

The station's transmitter site was originally on the north side of the Courtney Campbell Causeway near Clearwater.

First directional antenna in the United States

WFLA-WSUN's move to 620 kHz resulted in a nighttime interference complaint from another station on that frequency, WTMJ in Milwaukee, Wisconsin. WFLA-WSUN was ordered to reduce powers from 1,000 watts night and 2,500 watts day to 250 watts night and 500 watts day.

Station manager Walter Tison began an investigation into whether there was a way that WFLA-WSUN could increase its nighttime power to a more acceptable level. Working with 
T. A. M. Craven, a British engineer, Raymond M. Wilmotte, was engaged in 1932 to construct a then-theoretical antenna system that would reduce the signal sent toward Milwaukee. The idea that a directional antenna would resolve the issue was somewhat controversial, with some doubters stating that fluctuations in the ionosphere would cause issues, while others believed that instead of going directly to Milwaukee, the WFLA-WSUN signal was actually travelling west through the Gulf of Mexico, then turning north through the Mississippi valley.

The directional antenna installation, the first in the United States, consisting of two 200 foot (61 m) towers, was successful. As an example of its effectiveness, engineer Wilmotte noted that at one point a telegram was sent from regulators in Washington asking why WFLA-WSUN was off the air, because an inspector located in Atlanta was not receiving the station when it employed the directional antenna. Ultimately WSUN was allowed to operate fulltime with 5,000 watts.

WSUN and WFLA switch to separate licenses

In 1937, the joint ownership of WFLA-WSUN was severed, with the two stations continuing to operate on 620 kHz using a common transmitter, but separately licensed on a time-sharing basis. WSUN was allocated full-time use of Tuesdays, Thursdays, and Saturdays, and shared hours on Sundays.

WSUN becomes full-time station after WFLA transfer

In 1941, WFLA moved to 940 kHz, which allowed WSUN to begin operating with unlimited hours on 620 kHz.

WSUN's transmitter site moved to straddling the west end of the Gandy Causeway with  towers on concrete pilings in the Tampa Bay salt water in the early 1950s at 5 kW. As late as the 1990s, the original tower bases remained in their field,

Until 1974, WSUN offered a variety of programming including dramas, talk, music, and was an ABC affiliate. In 1974 then-owner Plough flipped the easy listening music format to country, eventually making the station one of the most successful AM stations in Florida. By the mid-1980's music audiences had moved to FM, and then-owner CBS switched to all news, which was unsuccessful, eventually switching back to country music.

In 1987 new owner Cox radio changed upon purchase to a hot talk format and the station was the home of the popular syndicated morning program The Ron & Ron Show (Ron and Ron) as well as hosting the Hooters-on-the-Radio show, Bob Lassiter (deceased), and a variety of other programs, including a psychic call in show with Gary Spivey. For a brief period, the station simulcasted programming from sister stations KFI Los Angeles and WIOD in Miami, including Neil Rogers, Rick and Suds, and Chris Baker.  The station also broadcast the Miami Dolphin NFL games.

Due to major interference from Cuban stations, from the 1990s the FCC granted WSUN a Special Temporary Authority (STA) to operate at 10 kW, twice the maximum power normally allowed for stations operating on "regional" frequencies.

All RF and electrical power and control cabling was run under the divided Gandy Highway in conduits that have an access manhole in the median and rise up out of the ground to the tower platform on the south side of Gandy "Redneck Riviera" Beach. The City of St. Petersburg eventually placed a channel 38 antenna on top of the north tower and a microwave reflector to deliver the programming to the transmitter building below. The weathered towers were replaced with shorter self supporters in the early 2000s with LED lighting.

The nationally syndicated program "Smoke This" got its start on WSUN, now on WFLA. Eventually, WSUN morphed into sports, becoming the flagship for the Tampa Bay Lightning, but dropped all talk programming by 1995, when it switched to a Standards music format.  On January 1, 1998, with a pending station sale, 620 kHz became a simulcast of Bay News 9, and the call letters were changed to WSAA. The WSUN call sign and format to 910 kHz. On January 1, 2000, as part of a major format and frequency swap, 1250 WDAE moved its calls and programming to 620 kHz.  Paxson owned Business talk-formatted WHNZ (at 570 kHz) and moved its calls and programming to 1250, while 570 was ultimately sold to Salem Broadcasting, who converted it to a Christian station and changed the call letters to WTWD (and later, WTBN).  Salem would also eventually buy 910 in Plant City as well, making it a simulcast WTWD/WTBN.

In 1999, WSUN's call sign was changed to WSAA. In 2000, the call sign was changed to WHNZ, and later that year to WDAE.

See also
WSUN-TV

References

External links
FCC History Cards for WDAE (covering 1937-1979 as WSUN on 620 kHz, beginning with split of WSUN and WFLA into two separate licenses)

SUN
Radio stations established in 1927
1927 establishments in Florida